Daniel Lungu is a Moldovan weightlifter. He represented Moldova at the 2019 World Weightlifting Championships, as well as the 2019 and 2021 European Championships.

At the 2021 European Junior & U23 Weightlifting Championships in Rovaniemi, Finland, he won the bronze medal in his event.

References

Living people
1998 births
Moldovan male weightlifters
21st-century Moldovan people